Michael Keith Simpson (born September 8, 1950) is an American politician and former dentist serving as the U.S. representative for  since 1999. The district covers most of the eastern portion of the state, including Idaho Falls, Pocatello, Sun Valley, Twin Falls and the northern two-thirds of Boise.

A member of the Republican Party, Simpson was first elected to public office in 1984, and was elected to the House in the 1998 elections, succeeding Mike Crapo. He served as Speaker of the Idaho House of Representatives from 1992 to 1998.

Early life, education and private career
Born in Burley, Simpson was raised in Blackfoot, where his father was a dentist. He graduated from Blackfoot High School in 1968, Utah State University in Logan in 1972, and the Washington University School of Dental Medicine in St. Louis, Missouri, in 1977. Simpson practiced dentistry in Blackfoot until his election to Congress in 1998. He was elected to the Blackfoot City Council in 1980 and to the state legislature in 1984, the first of seven terms. He was the Speaker of the Idaho House before his election to Congress.

U.S. House of Representatives

Elections

1998 
Simpson entered the 1998 campaign for the U.S. House seat vacated by Mike Crapo, who was running for United States Senate. He defeated former Democratic Congressman Richard H. Stallings, who held the seat from 1985 to 1993, in the general election with 52% of the vote. He has never faced another contest that close; Stallings was the last Democrat to win even 40% of the vote.

Simpson did not face serious opposition in 2000, 2002, or 2004. In 2006, Simpson defeated former Democratic state representative Jim D. Hansen, son of former Republican Congressman Orval H. Hansen, with 61% of the vote.

2008

Simpson defeated two primary challengers with 85.2% of the vote. He defeated Democratic nominee Debbie Holmes with 71% of the vote.

During the 2008 presidential primaries, Simpson was an early supporter of former Massachusetts Governor Mitt Romney and a member of his Congressional Whip Team.

2010

In the Republican primary, Simpson defeated Chick Heileson of Iona and Russ Mathews of Idaho Falls.

Simpson defeated Democratic nominee Mike Crawford and Independent candidate Brian Schad with 68.8% of the vote.

2012

In the Republican primary, Simpson defeated Chick Helieson with 69.6% of the vote. He defeated Democratic nominee Nicole LeFavour with 65.1% of the vote.

2014

In the Republican primary, Simpson defeated lawyer Bryan Smith with 61.8% of the vote. He defeated former congressman Richard H. Stallings in the general election with 61.4% of the vote.

2016 

In the Republican primary, Simpson defeated perennial candidate Lisa Marie with 73% of the vote. He defeated Jennifer Martinez and Anthony Tomkins in the general election with 62.9% of the vote.

2018

2020

2022 

In the Republican primary Simpson once again defeated his 2014 opponent Bryan Smith, this time by 54.6% to 32.7%, with three other candidates splitting the rest of the vote.

Tenure
While the Republican Party held the majority in the U.S. House of Representatives, Simpson often served as the Speaker Pro Tempore of the House, particularly during debates on controversial legislation, due to his command of House procedure. Simpson is known to have broken several sounding boards with the gavel while calling the House to order. This inspired him to have a number of sounding boards produced in Idaho, which he presented to then Speaker of the House Dennis Hastert as a joke. When the Republican Party regained control of the House of Representatives in 2010, Simpson began once again to serve frequently as Speaker Pro Tempore.

In the 111th United States Congress Simpson became the Ranking Member on the Interior, Environment, and Related Agencies Appropriations Subcommittee. He also serves as the small state representative on the 33-member House Republican Steering Committee. Known as the "committee of committees", the Steering Committee decides which Republican lawmakers become ranking members on House committees. Simpson replaced Don Young on the committee.

In December 2020, Simpson signed an amicus brief in support of Texas Attorney General Ken Paxton's lawsuit seeking to overturn the results of the 2020 presidential election.

Larry Craig scandal
During the 2007 scandal involving U.S. Senator Larry Craig, Simpson was openly considered for an appointment to the Senate if Craig resigned. But Simpson asked Governor C.L. "Butch" Otter to remove his name from consideration, claiming that the Idaho Congressional Delegation would be in a better position if he were to remain in the House and retain his seniority on the House Appropriations Committee.

Simpson rankled Senate leadership during the Craig scandal by criticizing them for their treatment of Craig. He said: "If that's how they treat their own, that tells me they're more interested in party than individuals, and the party is made up of individuals. How you treat them says a lot about your party." Simpson is not known to have condoned Craig's alleged misconduct, but demanded that Craig be treated fairly. For example, he said, "They have people over there [in the Senate Republican Conference] in far worse trouble that they haven't said a thing about."

2013 government shutdown
In October 2013, Simpson voted to end the United States federal government shutdown of 2013.

Health care 
Affordable Care Act repeal 
Simpson voted for and presided over the vote on the American Health Care Act of 2017, which passed the House on May 4, 2017.

Newborn health
Simpson was an original co-sponsor of the Newborn Screening Saves Lives Reauthorization Act of 2013 (H.R. 1281; 113th Congress), a bill that would amend the Public Health Service Act to reauthorize grant programs and other initiatives to promote expanded screening of newborns and children for heritable disorders. Simpson said: "the bill reflects the realities of reduced budgets Washington, but continues and strengthens the well established system of monitoring and evaluating infant conditions soon after birth. Just one small blood sample from the newborn's foot identifies infants with genetic or other conditions that can be treated quickly and effectively, saving and improving thousands of lives."

Energy and water 
On June 20, 2014, Simpson introduced the Energy and Water Development and Related Agencies Appropriations Act, 2015 (H.R. 4923; 113th Congress), a bill that would make appropriations for energy and water development and related agencies for FY2015. The bill would appropriate $34 billion, which is $50 million less than these agencies then received. The appropriations for the United States Department of Energy and the United States Army Corps of Engineers are made by this bill.

Gun rights
Simpson voted for and helped pass the National Right-to-Carry Reciprocity Act of 2011. Under this law, which passed the House on November 16, 2011, people with a valid license are allowed to carry a concealed weapon in other states as long as those states allow concealed weapons and do not have specific rules about concealed weapons carried by nonresidents.

Idaho-focused environmental legislation
Simpson's hallmark legislation is the Central Idaho Economic Development and Recreation Act (CIEDRA), which would create 312,000 acres of wilderness in central Idaho, much of which is currently a wilderness study area. He has faced substantial resistance from groups like the Sierra Club, which claim the bill lacks "wilderness values" because it allows for motorized access to certain parts of the wilderness area and some federal land would be transferred to the State of Idaho to promote the economic development of the local community and the recreational use of National Forest land and other public lands in central Idaho. Simpson has also faced opposition from groups that oppose new federal land designations, and wilderness designations particularly, because of restricted access to wilderness areas.

On March 21, 2014, Simpson introduced the bill To amend the Wild and Scenic Rivers Act to authorize the Secretary of the Interior to maintain or replace certain facilities and structures for commercial recreation services at Smith Gulch in Idaho (H.R. 4283; 113th Congress). The bill would require the United States Secretary of Agriculture to permit private entities to repair or replace certain commercial facilities on United States Forest Service land in Idaho. Simpson said, "this legislation clarifies Congress's intent of the 2004 amendments to the Wild and Scenic Rivers Act which continued the existing use and occupancy of commercial services in this corridor of the Salmon River".

In February 2021, Simpson announced a "Salmon and Energy" concept intended to restore Snake River salmon while protecting agricultural and energy interests across the Columbia River basin.

Judgeship reorganization

Simpson has actively pushed to divide the United States Court of Appeals for the Ninth Circuit, sponsoring bills to that effect in 2007, 2011, 2017, and 2021. None of these bills was successful.

Dentistry
A dentist himself, Simpson has worked closely with the American Dental Association on issues over the years. This has included co-sponsoring an unsuccessful 2009 bill intended to counter "methmouth", watching out for dentists' interests during the COVID pandemic, and in general pushing for better reimbursements and coverage for dental care.

Tax reform
Simpson voted for the Tax Cuts and Jobs Act of 2017. After passing the bill, he said he spoke to Idaho farmers, ranchers and businesses who called for a simplified tax code and reform. He said the bill would "create economic growth in the United States by unleashing American small businesses and unburdening middle-class families so they can make better financial decisions with their own money."

Texas v. Pennsylvania
In December 2020, Simpson was one of 126 Republican members of the House of Representatives to sign an amicus brief in support of Texas v. Pennsylvania, a lawsuit filed at the United States Supreme Court contesting the results of the 2020 presidential election, in which Joe Biden defeated incumbent Donald Trump. The Supreme Court declined to hear the case on the basis that Texas lacked standing under Article III of the Constitution to challenge the results of an election held by another state.

House Speaker Nancy Pelosi issued a statement that called signing the amicus brief an act of "election subversion." She also reprimanded Simpson and the other House members who supported the lawsuit: "The 126 Republican Members that signed onto this lawsuit brought dishonor to the House. Instead of upholding their oath to support and defend the Constitution, they chose to subvert the Constitution and undermine public trust in our sacred democratic institutions."

January 6 commission
On May 19, 2021, Simpson was one of 35 Republicans to join all Democrats in voting to approve legislation to establish the January 6 commission meant to investigate the attack of the U.S. Capitol.

Immigration
In 2021, Simpson voted for the Farm Workforce Modernization Act of 2021, which passes work visas for undocumented farm workers.

Simpson voted for the Further Consolidated Appropriations Act of 2020, which authorized DHS to nearly double the available H-2B visas for the remainder of FY 2020.

Simpson voted for the Consolidated Appropriations Act (H.R. 1158), which effectively prohibits Immigration and Customs Enforcement from cooperating with the Department of Health and Human Services to detain or remove illegal alien sponsors of Unaccompanied Alien Children.

Simpson supports Deferred Action for Childhood Arrivals (DACA).

LGBT rights
In 2021, Simpson was among the House Republicans to sponsor the Fairness for All Act, the Republican alternative to the Equality Act. The bill would prohibit discrimination on the basis of sex, sexual orientation, and gender identity, and protect the free exercise of religion.

In 2021, Simpson was one of 29 Republicans to vote to reauthorize the Violence Against Women Act. This bill expanded legal protections for transgender people and contained provisions allowing transgender women to use women's shelters and serve time in prisons matching their gender identity.

In 2022, Simpson was one of 47 House Republicans to vote with the Democratic Party to repeal the federal Defense of Marriage Act, and replace it with the Respect for Marriage Act. He later voted for the final form of the bill as passed in the Senate in December.

Committee assignments
 Committee on Appropriations
 Subcommittee on Energy and Water Development
 Subcommittee on Interior, Environment, and Related Agencies
 Subcommittee on Labor, Health and Human Services, Education, and Related Agencies

Party leadership
 House Republican Steering Committee

Caucus membership
 House Potato Caucus – Co-chair
 House Sugar Caucus – Co-chair
 Oral Health Caucus – Co-chair
 Congressional TRIO Caucus – Co-chair
Congressional Western Caucus
 Nuclear Cleanup Caucus
Republican Main Street Partnership

Political positions 
Simpson is a Republican who is known to be pragmatic on certain issues. For example, he was one of a handful of Republicans to vote for reauthorization of the State Children's Health Insurance Program (SCHIP) in the 110th Congress. He has also supported the National Endowment for the Arts and the National Endowment for the Humanities, voting each year against Republican amendments to strip them of funding. In the past, he has opposed "earmarks", or congressionally directed spending.

Esquire listed Simpson as one of the 10 Best Members of Congress in October 2008. The magazine wrote, "More than any other representative, Simpson lives by the philosophy that democratic representation is a matter of finding not advantageous positions but common ground". The magazine's portrayal of Simpson echoes one of his personal philosophies, which is embodied in Henry Clay's words: "Politics is not about ideological purity or moral self-righteousness. It is about governing, and if a politician cannot compromise he cannot govern effectively." This quotation is framed and hangs in Simpson's Washington D.C. office. Simpson played a key role in the election of John Boehner as House Majority Leader in the 109th United States Congress.

Domestic issues

Farming
Simpson is a strong supporter of domestic sugar beet producers and Idaho potato growers. In 2010, he took up the cause, alongside his former colleague Walt Minnick, the lead sponsor of the bill, to secure a third federal judge for Idaho. Simpson said, "The caseload of the Idaho District Court has increased significantly in recent decades resulting in Idaho's district judges carrying a disproportionate share of cases in relation to their colleagues in other states."

Gun law
Simpson was one of the members of Congress to sign the D.C. v. Heller amicus brief which supported a recognition of the Second Amendment as an individual right.

Health care
Simpson has committed to repealing the Patient Protection and Affordable Care Act, questioning its constitutionality and effectiveness. He was close and loyal to Speaker John Boehner.

Economic issues

Corporations
Simpson supports an agenda of low taxes and pro-business policies.

Tax reform
Simpson supports tax reform. When asked about the Grover Norquist pledge to oppose any net increase in taxes, Simpson said, "Well, first, the pledge: I signed that in 1998 when I first ran. I didn't know I was signing a marriage agreement that would last forever."

International issues

Climate change
In a 2019 conference in Boise, Simpson said: "climate change is a reality. It’s not hard to figure out. Go look at your thermometer." In his speech, he tied climate change to the viability of salmon in Idaho lakes and rivers.

Energy
Simpson is also known as an outspoken proponent of nuclear power, extolling its virtues as an environmentally friendly source of energy with minimal carbon output. His support for nuclear energy plays a significant role in his membership of the United States House Appropriations Subcommittee on Energy and Water Development, which oversees the Idaho National Laboratory, a main site for nuclear and alternative energy research in the United States.

Ukraine
In 2022, Simpson voted to provide approximately $14 billion to the government of Ukraine.

Social issues
Simpson supports efforts to make it illegal to desecrate the American flag.

Abortion
Simpson is anti-abortion. He has a zero rating from NARAL Pro-Choice America and a 100% rating from the National Right to Life Committee for his voting record on abortion. He opposes using federal monies to fund abortions, embryonic stem cell research, restricting the transport of minors over state lines to receive abortions, partial-birth abortions except to save a mother's life and human cloning. He supports cutting federal funding of Planned Parenthood.

Affirmative action
Simpson has a 28% rating from the NAACP for his affirmative action-related voting record.

Cannabis
Simpson has a "D" rating from NORML for his voting history on cannabis-related causes. He opposes veterans having access to medical marijuana if recommended by their Veterans Health Administration doctor and if it is legal for medicinal purposes in their state of residence.

Civil rights
Simpson had a 38% rating from the American Civil Liberties Union for his civil rights voting record in the 117th Congress as of November 2021.

LGBT rights
Simpson has had a zero score from the Human Rights Campaign for his LGBT voting record as recently as the 115th Congress, but in the 117th Congress he received a 14, in part for his votes for the Respect for Marriage Act and the Violence Against Women Act.

Big Tech
In 2022, Simpson was one of 39 Republicans to vote for the Merger Filing Fee Modernization Act of 2021, an antitrust package that would crack down on corporations for anti-competitive behavior.

Election results

Source:

See also
 Idaho's 2nd congressional district

References

External links
 Congressman Mike Simpson official U.S. House website
 Mike Simpson for Congress
 
 
 

|-

|-

|-

|-

1950 births
21st-century American politicians
American dentists
American Latter Day Saints
1984 Idaho elections
1988 Idaho elections
1990 Idaho elections
1992 Idaho elections
1994 Idaho elections
1996 Idaho elections
1998 Idaho elections
Latter Day Saints from Idaho
Living people
People from Blackfoot, Idaho
People from Burley, Idaho
Republican Party members of the United States House of Representatives from Idaho
Speakers of the Idaho House of Representatives
Utah State University alumni
Washington University School of Dental Medicine alumni
Washington University in St. Louis alumni